Sadaf Foroughi (born July 27, 1976) is an Iranian director, screenwriter, producer and editor. She has a bachelor's degree in French literature. After receiving her master's degree in film studies from University of Provence in Aix-en-Provence, France, she continued her studies toward a PhD in film philosophy. She also completed the New York Film Academy's film-making courses. Her films and video art pieces have been screened in venues and festivals around the world.

Filmography

Feature film

Short film
Director
2004 : Une Impression, ... aka An Impression (International: English title)
2005 : Nun, aka Bread (International: English title)
2005 : Simple Comme Bonjour
2007 : Féminin, Masculin
2007 : Sara dar dah daghigh-eh, aka Sara in 10 minutes (International: English title) 
2007 : Les Mains Sales
2007 : To be or not to be...
2009 : Shoosh, Lab-e Khat
2009 : The Kid and the Kite
2011 : La dernière scène (short)

Editor
2005 : Nun
2005 : Simple Comme Bonjour
2007 : Féminin, Masculin
2007 : Les Mains Sales
2007 : Sara dar dah daghigh-eh
2009 : Shoosh, Lab-e Khat (Co-edited with Kiarash Anvari)
2009 : The Kid and the Kite (Co-edited with Kiarash Anvari)

Producer
2004 : Une Impression
2005 : Nun
2005 : Simple Comme Bonjour
2006 : Duet (2006 film) (Co-producer)
2007 : Sara dar dah daghigh-eh
2009 : Shoosh, Lab-e Khat
2009 : The Kid and the Kite

Screenwriter
2004 : Une Impression
2005 : Nun
2005 : Simple Comme Bonjour
2007 : Féminin, Masculin
2007 : Les Mains Sales
2007 : Sara dar dah daghigh-eh
2007 : To be or not to be...
2009 : Shoosh, Lab-e Khat (Co-written with Kiarash Anvari)
2009 : The Kid and the Kite (Story)
2011 : La dernière scène (short)

Actor
2004 : An Abstract Expression

References

Sadaf Foroughi at Berlinale Talent Campus
 Watch Sara dar dah daghigh-eh online at Green Unplugged Online Film Festival
Sara in 10 minutes at Clermont-Ferrand Short Film Festival
Sadaf Foroughi at arte.tv
Why Democracy Films: Feminin - Masculin; A Short Film by Sadaf Foroughi
WHY DEMOCRACY? Filmmakers Respond
"Feminin, Masculin" in Documenta Madrid 2008
"Feminin, Masculin" in LIDF 2008
"Feminin, Masculin" in Berlinale 2008
"Feminin, Masculin" in One World, International Human Rights Documentary Film Festival 08
"Feminin, Masculin" in Regent Park Film Festival, Ontario, Canada 08
Féminin, Masculin is nominated for the Best Non-European Film Award at Grand Off 2008 in Warsaw
"Feminin, Masculin" won the best short film award from 7th Oxford Brookes University Annual Film and Music Festival, UK 09
"Feminin, Masculin" in Franklin Humanities Institute at Duke University, Durham, North Carolina 09
"Feminin, Masculin" in VIS Vienna Independent Shorts, Vienna, Austria 09
"Féminin, Masculin" in Senza Frontiere Film Festival, Rome, Italy 09
"Féminin, Masculin" in 2nd Cyprus International Short Film Festival 09
"Féminin, Masculin" in Multicultural Center Prague
Cinema senza frontiere 2009 and "Féminin, Masculin"

Iranian women film directors
Iranian film producers
Iranian experimental filmmakers
Artists from Tehran
1976 births
Living people
University of Provence alumni
New York Film Academy alumni
Best First Feature Genie and Canadian Screen Award winners
Women experimental filmmakers